Siarnaq, also designated Saturn XXIX, is a prograde irregular satellite of Saturn. It was discovered at the Mauna Kea Observatory by astronomers Brett Gladman and John Kavelaars in 2000, and given the temporary designation S/2000 S 3. It was named after Siarnaq, more widely known as Sedna, the Inuit goddess of the sea, and is the largest member of Saturn's Inuit group of irregular satellites.

Discovery 

Siarnaq was discovered by Canadian astronomers Brett Gladman and John Kavelaars at the Mauna Kea Observatory on 23 September 2000. The discovery of Siarnaq formed part of an observational campaign to search for distant irregular satellites around Saturn. The campaign was coordinated by Gladman in late 2000 and consisted of an international team of eight astronomers using various ground-based telescopes with CCD cameras to survey Saturn's Hill sphere, the region within which satellites can have stable orbits around the planet.

In September 2000, Gladman and Kavelaars conducted a wide-area survey down to a R-band limiting magnitude of 24.5 with the 3.6-meter Canada-France-Hawaii Telescope (CFHT) at the Mauna Kea Observatory in Hawaii. They reobserved their previous irregular satellite discoveries from August 2000 (Ymir and Paaliaq) and identified two new irregular satellite candidates needing further confirmation: Siarnaq and Tarvos. Siarnaq, the brighter of the two, was detected at an apparent magnitude of 20.

Follow-up and confirmation 

Between 25–29 September 2000, follow-up observations of Siarnaq and other newly-discovered Saturnian irregular satellites were made at various observatories. Preliminary orbit calculations ruled out the possibility that the satellites could be foreground asteroids and confirmed they were indeed orbiting Saturn. The discovery of Ymir, Paaliaq, Siarnaq, and Tarvos were formally reported by the International Astronomical Union on 25 October 2000 and announced by Gladman's team a day later at a meeting hosted by the American Astronomical Society's Division for Planetary Sciences. The discovery of the four satellites raised Saturn's known moons to 22, surpassing Uranus's moon count of 21 at the time.

Although Siarnaq was confirmed as a satellite, the orbit was poorly known due to an insufficient number of observations. The moon was reobserved by the Kitt Peak National Observatory in December 2000, and later by the Palomar and La Palma observatories in early 2001. In the interim, Gladman's team had discovered eight more irregular satellites of Saturn, raising the planet's number of known moons to 30 and resultingly overtaking Jupiter as the planet with the most known moons until 2003.

Name 
The moon is named after Siarnaq, the Inuit sea giantess or goddess and ruler of the Inuit underworld Adlivun. In other variants of Inuit legend, she is also known by other names such as Nuliajuk and Sedna. Siarnaq is said to reside at the bottom of the ocean and to have conceived all sea life, which she will withhold from Inuit hunters when angered. In some versions of Inuit legend, Siarnaq was once a beautiful maiden who was tricked into marrying a bird-man and then was rescued by her father. They came under attack by a storm, which provoked the desperate father to sacrifice her to the sea in order to save himself.

The moon received its name in a formal notice published by the IAU on 8 August 2003, one month after its approval by the IAU's Working Group for Planetary System Nomenclature in a general assembly held in July 2003. Siarnaq was also assigned the Roman numeral designation Saturn XXIX, the 29th moon of Saturn.

Background 
Before Siarnaq was given its name, it was formerly known by the provisional designation S/2000 S 3 assigned by the IAU in the discovery announcement. The provisional designation indicates that it was the third Saturnian satellite identified in images taken in 2000. Siarnaq is among the first Saturnian irregular satellites discovered since Phoebe in 1898; the discovery of new satellite groups of Saturn provided the opportunity for their discoverers to establish new naming conventions for each of them.

Kavelaars was advised by his colleagues to deviate from the traditional Greco-Roman mythology theme for Saturnian moons and instead propose names from different cultures. Throughout late 2000, Kavelaars spent several months consulting Amerindian scholars for appropriate name suggestions that were both multicultural and Canadian in origin. In March 2001, he was reading the Inuit tale Hide and Sneak to his children and had a revelation. He contacted the author of the tale, Michael Kusugak, to get his assent, and the latter suggested the names Kiviuq and Sedna. Kavelaars then decided that the selected Inuit names should end in the letter q to distinguish the group—hence the name Sedna was changed to Siarnaq. The former name was later used for 90377 Sedna, a distant trans-Neptunian object discovered in 2003.

Physical characteristics

Diameter and albedo 

From infrared observations by the Wide-field Infrared Survey Explorer (WISE) spacecraft, Siarnaq is estimated to be  in diameter.

Color 
It is light red in color, and the Siarnaupian (Siarnaqan) spectrum in the infrared is very similar to the Inuit-group satellites Paaliaq and Kiviuq, supporting the thesis of a possible common origin in the break-up of a larger body.

Shape and rotation 

The rotation period of Siarnaq was measured by the Cassini spacecraft to be 10.19 hours; this is the shortest rotation period of all prograde irregular moons of Saturn. Siarnaq displays a light curve with three maxima and minima over a full rotation, implying a roughly triangular shape similar to that of Ymir. From Cassini observations of Siarnaq at different phase angles, the orientation of its north rotational pole has been determined to be pointing toward 98° ecliptic latitude and −23° ecliptic longitude. This corresponds to a sideways axial tilt, indicating that Siarnaq experiences long, extreme seasons similar to the planet Uranus.

Orbit 

The moon has been found to be in a secular resonance with Saturn, involving the precession of its periapsis and that of the planet.

Although color similarities suggest a shared origin for all the Inuit group members, the orbital components of Siarnaq are more similar to Tarqeq's, suggesting that the latter is a fragment of the former.

Notes

References

External links 

 Natural Satellites Ephemeris Service, Minor Planet Center
 Siarnaq In Depth, NASA Solar System Exploration, updated 19 December 2019
 Siarnaq (S/2000 S 3), Tilmann Denk, updated 19 October 2019
 Four more moons for Saturn, David Adam, Nature, 26 October 2000
 New moons: not standing alone, David Adam, Nature, 26 October 2000
 The Irregular Satellites of Saturn, Brett Gladman, Observatoire de la Cote d'Azur, October 2000

Inuit group
Moons of Saturn
Irregular satellites
Discoveries by Brett J. Gladman
Astronomical objects discovered in 2000
Moons with a prograde orbit